VDE-Gallo Records is a small record label, based in Lausanne, Switzerland. It specializes in world music and classical music.

Under an ultimatum from the E & J Gallo Winery it was forced to change its name in the US. Exclusively in the American market it uses the name VDE-Gallo.

See also
List of record labels

External links
Website

Swiss record labels
Classical music record labels
World music record labels